Mark Mylod is a British television and film director and executive producer. He is known for his work on the television series Succession and Shameless, as well as for directing the horror-comedy film The Menu (2022).

Career
Mark Mylod has directed several television shows in the United States and the United Kingdom, many of them for the BBC. He directed the feature films Ali G Indahouse, The Big White and What's Your Number? and the series Cold Feet, The Royle Family, and Bang Bang, It's Reeves and Mortimer. 

Mylod co-produced the HBO television series Entourage, where he was also a regular director.. He would direct and executive-produce the pilot episode of the U.S. version of the dramedy, Shameless, for Showtime. He remained a co-executive producer and frequent director on the series.

In 2011, Mylod directed and executive-produced the pilot of the ABC fantasy series Once Upon a Time. He would go on to direct the pilot episode for American TV Series The Affair in 2014. In the same year, he directed episodes 3 and 4 of Season 5 of the HBO series Game of Thrones. He returned to the show for Season 6, where he directed episodes 7 and 8 and episodes 2 and 3 of Season 7.

Mylod was an executive producer and director during seasons 1, 2, and 3 of Succession for HBO. He directed the film The Menu, starring Ralph Fiennes, that was released in November 2022.

Filmography
Film
 Ali G Indahouse (2002)
 The Big White (2005)
 What's Your Number? (2011)
 The Menu (2022)

Television

Personal life
Mylod is married to costume designer Amy Westcott.

References

External links
 

British film directors
Living people
Primetime Emmy Award winners
Year of birth missing (living people)